The San (Sian) is a river in southeastern Poland and western Ukraine, a tributary of the river Vistula, with a length of  (it is the 6th-longest Polish river) and a basin area of 16,877 km2 (14,426 km2 of it in Poland).

Etymology
 in proto-Indo-European languages means 'speed' or 'rapid stream'. In Celtic languages,  means 'river'.

Course
Poland's largest artificial lake, Lake Solina, was created by a dam on the San River near Lesko.

Tributaries

History of the region 
Historical records first mention the river in 1097 as Sanъ, reku Sanъ, k Sanovi; then as nad Sanomъ (1152) and Sanu (1287). On the old maps of the Ruthenian Voivodeship, Poland 1339–1772 it was referred to as "San" (1339), San (1372), "Szan" (1406), "Sanok" (1438), "Saan" (1439), "Sayn" (1445), "San" (1467), "Szan" (1517), and "Schan" (1526).

Humans had first settled the southeastern region of present-day Poland (the Subcarpathian Voivodeship or Podkarpacie) in prehistoric times. In the pre-Roman era various tribes, including the Celts, Goths and Vandals (Przeworsk culture and Puchov culture)
overran the area. After the fall of the Roman Empire, Hungarians and Slavs invaded the area.

The San valley must have become an important trade-route and axis of human settlement as early as the 9th or 10th century. The region subsequently became part of the Great Moravian state. Upon the invasion of the Hungarian tribes into the heart of the Great Moravian Empire around 899, the Lendians of the area declared their allegiance to the Hungarian Empire. The region then became a site of contention between Poland, Kievan Rus and Hungary starting in around the 9th century. This area was mentioned for the first time in 981 (by Nestor), when Volodymyr the Great of Kievan Rus took the area over on his way into Poland. In 1018 it returned to Poland, in 1031 reverted to Rus, and in 1340 was recovered by Casimir III of Poland.

During the years 966–1018, 1340–1772 (the Ruthenian Voivodeship) and 1918–1939, the region was part of Poland. Between 1772 and 1918 it belonged to the Austrian empire, which became the Austro-Hungarian empire when the double monarchy was introduced. This region, including the area west and east of the Subcarpathian Voivodship, was controlled by Austria for almost 120 years. During that time it was known as Galicia.

Ukrainians traditionally associated the San with their ethnographic western frontier: this is reflected in the State Anthem of Ukraine (which describes Ukraine as extending from the San to the Don) and the March of Ukrainian Nationalists (which calls for a Ukraine from the San to the Caucasus). The Poland–Ukraine border today follows the San for approximately the first 50 km of its course.

The San River, which has seen many battles in its history, was a battle site at the beginning of World War II in 1939. At the outset of the German invasion of Poland, Polish forces attempted to defend a line along the San from September 6, until German forces broke out of their bridgeheads on September 12.

Cities 
Dubiecko, Dynów, Jarosław, Lesko, Leżajsk, Nisko, Przemyśl, Radymno, Rudnik nad Sanem, Sandomierz, Sanok, Sieniawa, Stalowa Wola, Ulanów, Zagórz

See also
 Łęg Rokietnicki
 Rivers of Poland
 Walddeutsche

References

Literature 
 Geographical Dictionary of the Kingdom of Poland and other Slavic Lands Słownik geograficzny Królestwa Polskiego i innych krajów słowiańskich. tom. X, pages 260 - 263. Warszawa. 1876. (digital edition)

 
International rivers of Europe
Poland–Ukraine border
Rivers of Lviv Oblast
Rivers of Podkarpackie Voivodeship
Rivers of Poland